Johnny Cash Sings the Songs That Made Him Famous is a compilation album by American singer-songwriter Johnny Cash, originally released on December 1, 1958 by Sun Records. The album is made up of songs Cash recorded for Sun prior to leaving the label for Columbia Records. The album was re-issued in 2003, under the label Varèse Sarabande, with four different versions of songs already available on the original LP as bonus tracks. The complete contents of the album are also incorporated into an extended version of the previous collection With His Hot and Blue Guitar included in the 2012 box set Johnny Cash: The Complete Columbia Album Collection.

Track listing

Personnel
Johnny Cash — vocals, rhythm guitar
Luther Perkins - lead Guitar
Marshall Grant - bass
Technical
Sam Phillips - producer
Jack Clement - producer
Cary E. Mansfield — reissue producer
Bill Dahl — liner notes, reissue producer
Dan Hersch — digital remastering
Bill Pitzonka — reissue art director

Charts
Singles - Billboard (United States)

References

External links
 LP Discography entry on Sings the Songs That Made Him Famous

Sings the Songs That Made Him Famous
1958 albums
Sun Records albums
Albums produced by Sam Phillips
Albums produced by Jack Clement
Albums recorded at Sun Studio